The 2018 Israel Super Cup is the 23rd Israel Super Cup (28th, including unofficial matches, as the competition wasn't played within the Israel Football Association in its first 5 editions, until 1969), an annual Israel football match played between the winners of the previous season's Top Division and Israel State Cup. This is the Third time since 1990 that the match was staged, after a planned resumption of the cup was cancelled in 2014.

The game was played between Hapoel Be'er Sheva, champions of the 2017–18 Israeli Premier League and Hapoel Haifa, winners of the 2017–18 Israeli State Cup. Hapoel Haifa won 5–4 on penalties following a 1–1 draw after 90 minutes.

Match details

References

Israel Super Cup
2018–19 in Israeli football
Israel Super Cup
Super Cup 2018
Super Cup 2018
Israel Super Cup matches

Israel Super Cup 2018